"Baby Did a Bad Bad Thing" is a song by American musician Chris Isaak, released as the first track to the 1995 album Forever Blue. Filled with sensuality and erotic imagery, the song was described by Isaak as a declaration to "somebody who is so evil and twisted and bad, and yet, you still want them". The title evokes how "That’s a bad bad thing" is used by both parents scolding misbehaving children and adults during sexual intercourse. In September 1999, a remix of the song peaked at number nine on the Australian ARIA Singles Chart, outperforming the number-27 peak of the original. In the United States, the 1999 reissue reached number three on the Billboard Adult Alternative Songs chart.

Background
Similar to how Isaak's "Wicked Game" only became a success following its inclusion in Wild at Heart (1990), the song got most of its mainstream recognition after being featured in the 1999 Stanley Kubrick film Eyes Wide Shut, starring Tom Cruise and Nicole Kidman. Kubrick heard the song as Kidman listened to Isaak's music to liven up during rehearsals. Isaak was asked for his approval as he prepared to perform on The Tonight Show, and immediately agreed once he was told it was for Kubrick, who Isaak declared "hasn't done a film I didn't like". The singer said he always considered "Baby Did a Bad Bad Thing" ripe for soundtracks due to being "kind of a strange piece of work, with a really driving beat and a manic energy that I thought would probably work well for some visuals". David Kahne remixed the track for the Eyes Wide Shut trailers and television spots, and the redone version was released as a radio single on June 22, 1999. Isaak has approved of the remix, feeling it was "more rocking and everything sounds louder".

Music video
The music video of the song was commissioned after its inclusion on Eyes Wide Shut, and directed by Herb Ritts, who also did the video for Isaak's "Wicked Game". It features French model Laetitia Casta videotaped in a motel room gyrating sexually being watched by Isaak. Casta was dressed in lingerie and wore a black wig throughout the video. In July 1999, VH1 aired two versions of the music video, the censored version was played before 9 p.m. and the uncensored version was played after 9 p.m. The video was initially regarded as too steamy by the network. The video was ranked number 28 on VH1's 50 Sexiest Video Moments.

Charts

Weekly charts

Year-end charts

Certifications

Release history

References

1994 songs
1995 singles
1999 singles
Chris Isaak songs
Music videos directed by Herb Ritts
Reprise Records singles
Song recordings produced by Erik Jacobsen
Songs written by Chris Isaak
Warner Music Group singles